Jean-Philippe de Tonnac is a French novelist, essayist, and journalist who directed the special editions of the Nouvel Observateur. He is the author of about twenty published books, among them "The Asexual Revolution" (2006).

Publications

Essays 
 Qui vive ?, textes rassemblés en hommage à Julien Gracq, éd. José Corti, Paris, 1989
 Les Promenades de Herman Hesse, photos de Daniel Faure, Le Chêne, Paris, 1996
 Les Hauts Lieux sacrés de France, photos de Daniel Faure, Le Chêne, Paris, 1997
 [Biographie] René Daumal, l'archange, éd. Grasset, Paris, 1998
Révérence à la vie, conversations avec Théodore Monod, éd. Grasset, Paris, 2002
 Anorexia, Enquête sur l'expérience de la faim, éd. Albin Michel, Paris, 2005
 La Révolution asexuelle : Ne pas faire l'amour, un nouveau phénomène de société, éd. Albin Michel, Paris, 2006, 
 Bob Marley, Folio Biographies n°69, 2010 -  
 Jean-Philippe de Tonnac (dir.) - Stephen Laurence Kaplan (intro.), Dictionnaire universel du pain, éd. Robert Laffont,  « Bouquins », Paris, 2010,

Novels 
 Père des brouillards, éd. Fayard, 2002
 Azyme, AzymeActes sud, 2016

References

French writers
French male novelists
French essayists
Living people
French male non-fiction writers
Year of birth missing (living people)